Muhammadi, also known as Jamia Muhammadi Sharif, is a village of Bhawana Tehsil in Chiniot District of Punjab province of Pakistan.  It is named after Mian Muhammadi Juwan( a Sufi and disciple of saints of Multan originally named Mian Imam Deen ), located at 2 km of the left bank of the Chenab River. The village is  famous due to its religious background.  It's the home of Mualana Muhammad Zakir, a well known saint, and politician.  His son Maulana Muhammad Rahmat-ul-Allah Khokhar also a politician, remained MNA. This village has a famous dar-ul-uloom which has produced many religious scholars.

References

Chiniot District
Villages in Chiniot District